Clecildo Rafael Martins de Souza Ladislau (born 17 March 1989), known as Martins, is a Brazilian professional footballer who plays for Portuguese club Casa Pia A.C. as a striker.

Club career
Born in Santos, São Paulo, Martins joined Audax São Paulo Esporte Clube's youth setup in 2003, aged 14. In December 2007, he signed with Grêmio Foot-Ball Porto Alegrense on loan, and was promoted to the latter's main squad in 2009.

Martins made his professional debut on 21 January 2009, coming on as a second-half substitute in a 1–1 draw at Esporte Clube Internacional. He returned to his parent club in September, and subsequently served loans at Deportivo Aragón and Grêmio Prudente Futebol before being assigned to Audax's first team.

Martins joined ABC Futebol Clube in March 2011 after impressing in the state leagues, but was rarely used by his new team, returning to Audax in December. He continued to find the net at an excellent rate in the following two years, and moved to Vitória F.C. on loan on 8 July 2013.

After ranking third in the goal charts for the Portuguese side to help them finish in seventh position in his first and only season, Martins signed a three-year contract with La Liga's Levante UD on 18 July 2014. He made his debut in the competition on 24 August, replacing David Barral in the 71st minute of a 0–2 home loss against Villarreal CF.

On 25 August 2015, after being sparingly used by the Valencians, Martins returned to Portugal and its top division after agreeing to a one-year loan deal with Moreirense FC. He scored 16 goals in his only season, being essential as the Miguel Leal-led side finished 12th and avoided relegation from the Primeira Liga while becoming the club's all-time scorer in the competition after surpassing Nabil Ghilas.

From January 2017 to June 2018, Martins represented Vitória S.C. also in the Portuguese top tier. On 3 July 2018, he moved to the China League One with Zhejiang Greentown.

Career statistics

References

External links

1989 births
Living people
Sportspeople from Santos, São Paulo
Brazilian footballers
Association football forwards
Campeonato Brasileiro Série A players
Campeonato Brasileiro Série B players
Grêmio Osasco Audax Esporte Clube players
Grêmio Foot-Ball Porto Alegrense players
ABC Futebol Clube players
Associação Chapecoense de Futebol players
La Liga players
Segunda División players
Tercera División players
Real Zaragoza B players
Levante UD footballers
Primeira Liga players
Vitória F.C. players
Moreirense F.C. players
Vitória S.C. players
Casa Pia A.C. players
China League One players
Zhejiang Professional F.C. players
Brazilian expatriate footballers
Expatriate footballers in Spain
Expatriate footballers in Portugal
Expatriate footballers in China
Brazilian expatriate sportspeople in Spain
Brazilian expatriate sportspeople in Portugal
Brazilian expatriate sportspeople in China